The 2010–11 LEN Women's Champions' Cup was the 24th edition of the highest-level competition in women's European club water polo. It involved the champions and other top teams from European national leagues and ran from December 2010 to April 2011. The Final Four (semifinals, final, and third place game) took place in Sabadell, Spain.

Final Four host CN Sabadell became the first Spanish team to win the competition beating Orizzonte Catania in the final. Olympiacos CFP and Kinef Kirishi also reached the final Four, with Olympiacos ranking third, while defending champion Vouliagmeni OC was defeated by Orizzonte in the quarter-finals.

Federation team allocation
Each national federation can enter up to two teams into the Women's Champions' Cup.
 Seeded Federations are the federations who placed a team in the final Four of the previous' year's competition. In 2009/10, these countries were: Greece (2), Italy, and Russia
 All other federations  are unseeded

Federations do not have to enter their top two teams into the Champions' Cup. If they do not think their clubs can be competitive, they can enter teams into the second-tier LEN Cup.

Format and Changes
The original format for the Champions' Cup was to have four phases:
 A qualification round of 4 groups of any size played as a Round-robin tournament at the site of a host team
 A preliminary round of 4 groups of 4 played as a Round-robin tournament at the site of a host team
 A quarterfinal round played as a Two-legged tie
 The Final Four played as a Knockout tournament at a pre-selected site

However, there were only 13 entries, so the qualification round was cancelled, and the preliminary round will be played with 3 groups of 3 and 1 group of 4.

Distribution

Teams
There were 13 entries from 7 countries. Each of the draw pots were organised according to the previous year's results:
Bold indicates countries that entered teams

Note: The Netherlands only entered one team, so the two available places in Pot 3 were taken by a second German team and a French team elevated from Pot 4.

Round and Draw Dates

Tournament Phase

First qualifying round

Group A

Group B

Group C

Group D

Quarter-finals

Final four
 Piscina Can Llong, Sabadell

References

LEN Euro League Women seasons
Women, Euro League
2010 in water polo
2011 in water polo
LEN
LEN